Monden may refer to:

 Monden Station a railway station on the Aizu Railway Aizu Line in Aizuwakamatsu, Fukushima Prefecture, Japan
 Bruno Monden (1900–1980), German art director
 Christiaan Monden professorial fellow in sociology at Nuffield College, University of Oxford